Doze may refer to:

To sleep or nap
To bulldoze
Doze (Android), a power management scheme introduced in Android Marshmallow and expanded in Android Nougat

See also